Klimke is a surname. Notable people with the surname include:

 Christoph Klimke, German writer
 Ingrid Klimke (born 1968), German eventing rider
 Jürgen Klimke (born 1948), German politician 
 Reiner Klimke (1936–1999), German equestrian
 Rudolf Klimke (1890–1986), World War flying ace